Blue Ridge High School, also known as BRHS, is a public high school for students, grades 9-12, located in the town of Blue Ridge, Texas (USA). The school enrolls students in grades 9-12. The school colors green and white, and the mascot is the Tiger. In 2017, the school was rated "Met Standard" by the Texas Education Agency.

Academics

The student to faculty ratio is approximately 10 to 1, and the average class size is 15 students.

Grades are weighted on a 4.0 scale.

Academic extra-curriculars
Students at the BRHS participate in numerous University Interscholastic League (UIL) sponsored competitions.

Campus and facilities

Blue Ridge High School is an open campus containing several buildings.

Athletics
The Blue Ridge Tigers compete in the following sports:

 Baseball
 Basketball
 Cross Country
 Football
 Golf
 Powerlifting
 Softball
 Tennis
 Track and Field
 Volleyball

Finalists
Blue Ridge team sports have advanced to play in four state tournaments:
1A State Semifinalists - Baseball 2000
1A State Finalists - Softball 2010 
1A State Finalists - Baseball 2011
1A State Qualifiers - Boys Golf 2012

See also

List of high schools in Texas

References 

"Blue Ridge Highschool-Faculty". BRISD. 29 Feb. 2008. BRISD. Retrieved on 2008-04-28.
"Blue Ridge Highschool-Athletics". BRISD. 22 Jan. 2008. BRISD. Retrieved on 2008-04-28.
"2007 Accountable Data Tables" (PDF). TEA. 2008. TEA. Retrieved on 2008-04-28.
http://ritter.tea.state.tx.us/perfreport/account/2008/static/summary/d043917.html
http://www.tea.state.tx.us/news_release.aspx?id=2147505041

External links 
Blue Ridge High School website

High schools in Collin County, Texas
Public high schools in Texas